Benaissa Abed (born 3 October 1964) is an Algerian boxer. He competed in the 1988 Summer Olympics, reaching the quarter finals of the flyweight category before losing to Andreas Tews of East Germany.

References

1964 births
Living people
Flyweight boxers
Boxers at the 1988 Summer Olympics
Algerian male boxers
Olympic boxers of Algeria
21st-century Algerian people
20th-century Algerian people